Crystal is a high-level general-purpose, object-oriented programming language, designed and developed by Ary Borenszweig, Juan Wajnerman, Brian Cardiff and more than 300 contributors. With syntax inspired by the language Ruby, it is a compiled language with static type-checking, but specifying the types of variables or method arguments is generally unneeded. Types are resolved by an advanced global type inference algorithm. Crystal 
is currently in active development. It is released as free and open-source software under the Apache License version 2.0.

History 
Work on the language began in June 2011, with the aim of merging the elegance and productivity of Ruby with the speed, efficiency, and type safety of a compiled language. Initially named Joy, it was quickly renamed to Crystal.

The Crystal compiler was first written in Ruby, but later rewritten in Crystal, thus becoming self-hosting, as of November 2013. The first official version was released in June 2014. In July 2016, Crystal joined the TIOBE index.

Description 
Although resembling the Ruby language in syntax, Crystal compiles to much more efficient native code using an LLVM backend, at the cost of precluding the dynamic aspects of Ruby. The advanced global type inference used by the Crystal compiler, combined with union types, gives it more the feel of a higher-level scripting language than many other comparable programming languages. It has automated garbage collection and offers a Boehm collector. Crystal possesses a macro system and supports generics as well as method and operator overloading. Its concurrency model is inspired by communicating sequential processes (CSP) and implements lightweight fibers and channels (for interfiber communication) inspired by Go.

Examples

Hello World 
This is the simplest way to write the Hello World program in Crystal:

puts "Hello World!"
The same as in Ruby.

Or using an object-oriented programming style:

class Greeter
  def initialize(@name : String)
  end

  def salute
    puts "Hello #{@name}!"
  end
end

g = Greeter.new("world")
g.salute

HTTP server 
require "http/server"

server = HTTP::Server.new do |context|
  context.response.content_type = "text/plain"
  context.response.print "Hello world! The time is #{Time.local}"
end

server.bind_tcp("0.0.0.0", 8080)
puts "Listening on http://0.0.0.0:8080"
server.listen

TCP echo server 
require "socket"

def handle_client(client)
  message = client.gets
  client.puts message
end

server = TCPServer.new("localhost", 1234)
while client = server.accept?
  spawn handle_client(client)
end

Type inference and union types 
The following code defines an array containing different types with no usable common ancestor. Crystal automatically creates a union type out of the types of the individual items.

desired_things = [:unicorns, "butterflies", 1_000_000]
p typeof(desired_things.first) # typeof returns the compile time type, here (Symbol | String | Int32)
p desired_things.first.class   # the class method returns the runtime type, here Symbol

Concurrency 
Channels can be used to communicate between fibers, which are initiated using the keyword spawn.

channel = Channel(Int32).new

spawn do
  puts "Before first send"
  channel.send(1)
  puts "Before second send"
  channel.send(2)
end

puts "Before first receive"
value = channel.receive
puts value # => 1

puts "Before second receive"
value = channel.receive
puts value # => 2

Further reading

References

External links 
 
 Documentation
 
 /r/crystal_programming subreddit
 Crystal Announcements

Object-oriented programming languages
Programming languages created in 2014
Software using the Apache license
Statically typed programming languages